Ssa2 is the second album by South Korean singer Psy, released on January 16, 2002. The album contains 14 songs and was later released worldwide through iTunes. Commercially, the album sold nearly 74,000 copies by the end of 2002 and was the 76th best-selling album of the year in South Korea.

Release and controversy
After the controversy which surrounded the release of his first album Psy from the Psycho World! in early 2001, and being fined for explicit content, this second album's release at the beginning of 2002 followed in its footsteps. In November 15, 2001, he was arrested for smoking marijuana, ordered to pay 10,000,000 won for his bail and heavy fine of 500,000 won, and spent 25 days in jail. He responded by writing songs about the controversies and government censors complained about the "defiant and obscene lyrics" on his second album.

While the first album contained only one explicit song, half the songs in the new album received explicit warnings and could not be sold to persons under 19. Korean civil groups complained to the government standards board and he was fined again.

Critical reception
Alice Vincent of The Telegraph said the album "sparked complaints from authorities that it would negatively influence children, cementing Psy's reputation for controversy and eccentricity."

Track listing

Charts and sales

Monthly charts

Year-end charts

Sales

Notes

External link
Korean News report from 2002 about the controversy around the album

References

2002 albums
Korean-language albums
Psy albums